Arthur McMahon may refer to:

 Arthur Henry McMahon (1862–1949), British Indian Army officer and diplomat
 Arthur McMahon (sport shooter) (born 1921), Irish sports shooter

See also
 Arthur MacMahon (1890–1980), American political scientist